Parvathipuram Municipality is the local self-government in Parvathipuram, a city in the Indian state of Andhra Pradesh. It is classified as a First grade municipality.

Administration
The present municipal commissioner of the town is D.Narasinga Rao.

See also
 List of municipalities in Andhra Pradesh

References

1959 establishments in Andhra Pradesh
Government agencies established in 1959
Municipal Councils in Andhra Pradesh